The Khmer Neutral Party is a political party in Cambodia. It has its headquarters in Kampong Chhnang.

First participating in the 1993 Cambodian general election, winning 1.3% of the vote, the party believes in promoting a pluralistic political system, combining both right-wing and left-wing ideologies. It also supports liberalism and democracy, opposing absolutism and genocide.

References

External links
 Khmer Neutral Party website

Cambodian democracy movements
Political parties in Cambodia
Political parties with year of establishment missing
Social democratic parties in Cambodia